In March and April 2009, an outbreak of a new strain of influenza commonly referred to as swine flu infected many people in Mexico and parts of the United States causing severe illness in the former. The new strain was identified as a combination of several different strains of Influenzavirus A, subtype H1N1, including separate strains of this subtype circulating in humans (see Human influenza) and in pigs (see Swine influenza). Spain was the first country in continental Europe to report cases of swine flu, in late April 2009.

First cases in Europe 
On 27 April, Spain confirmed the first case of Swine influenza in Europe. The patient was a 23-year-old man that had returned from Mexico on the 22nd and was in hospital with flu-like symptoms. The case was confirmed in Almansa, in the province of Albacete.

On 28 April, a second case was confirmed in Valencia. The patient had traveled to Mexico with the first confirmed patient. Other cases in Valencia and the Basque Country were reported soon afterwards.

By 30 April, there were 13 confirmed and 80 unconfirmed cases throughout Spain.

By 5 May, there were 73 confirmed cases, of which only nine had not travelled to Mexico in the previous four months.

By 29 April 2010, Spain had confirmed 1,536 cases and 300 deaths, as well as reporting 155,051 unconfirmed cases.

Response 
The Health and Social Policy minister, Trinidad Jiménez, announced that all passengers coming from Mexico, United States, Canada, New Zealand, Colombia, France and Israel have to fill a form during their flight.

There was a reinforcement of medical teams in all airports to handle possible swine flu cases.

The Ministry of Foreign Affairs recommended cancelling any travel to Mexico unless strictly necessary. It also recommended reevaluating the need to travel to the United States.

Affected areas

Confirmed cases 
 There are 969 confirmed cases, with the latest all taken by awaiting samples. The Spanish government has affirmed the situation is under constant monitoring and control, recommending the population not to panic.
 Madrid has the greatest number of confirmed cases.
 The North African Spanish cities of Ceuta and Melilla and also La Rioja have not reported any confirmed cases of swine flu.

Deaths 

A 19-year-old woman in Spain became the first patient in continental Europe who died because of swine flu. A second death was confirmed on 9 July in the Canary Islands, it was a 41-year-old man with a chronic disease.
The second affected land in Europe has reported seven death cases up to 29 July.

Madrid outbreak 
In early June, Madrid had an outbreak of swine flu among school children.  By 9 June over 100 school children in Madrid had been confirmed to have swine flu.

Confirmed cases by autonomous community

Andalusia 
On 21 August 2009 the first death occurred in Andalusia when a 39-year-old woman, 39 weeks pregnant, died six days after being admitted to the Hospital Valme in Sevilla. On the same day, a 50-year-old woman died in the Hospital de La Línea (Cádiz) after being admitted on 3 August. 

On 23 August, a morbidly obese 20-year-old woman died after being admitted to the Hospotal San Cecilio de Granada on 19 August. This was the third fatality due to H1N1 that weekend.

Community of Madrid 
On 22 May 2009, the Ministry of Defence quarantined the Military Engineering Academy in Hoyo de Manzanares, where there were six confirmed and a further five suspected cases.

On 1 June 2009, the Community of Madrid Health Office (represented by Juan José Güemes) confirmed two cases at the Isaac Albéniz secondary school and announced that this number could increase considerably in the future. The school head reported 25 cases, but these have not been confirmed.

On 9 June 2009, the Community of Madrid Health Office confirmed 121 cases in 17 schools. On 11 June 2009, there were 139 cases confirmed in 22 schools.

On 29 June 2009 a 20-year-old woman died after giving birth, becoming the first to die of H1N1 infection in Spain.

On 16 July, the fourth death in Spain and second in the Community of Madrid occurred. A 71-year-old man with chronic obstructive pulmonary disease died in the Hospital Universitario La Paz, Madrid.

On 24 August 2009, a man died in a Madrid hospital (although his identity was not revealed on his family's request). This was the sixteenth death due to the H1N1 virus in Spain.

Canary Islands 
On 9 July 2009 the second death occurred in the Canary Islands. A 41-year-old man died in the ICU of the Hospital Universitario de Gran Canaria Doctor Negrín in Las Palmas. His rapid deterioration was due to a previous condition.

On 12 August, the tenth death due to H1N1 occurred in Spain with the death of a 30-year-old man, admitted to the Hospital Insular de Gran Canaria on 20 July, who also showed additional risk factors.

On 17 August, an 11-year-old boy died of a chronic illness which was aggravated by the H1N1 infection.

Balearic Islands 
On 16 July 2009, the third death occurred in the Hospital Son Llàtzer, Palma, Majorca. The deceased was a 33-year-old Nigerian woman with no previous health issues.

Valencian community 
On 20 July 2009 in Teulada, Spain a man who had been on dialysis since 1993 died. This was the fifth death at the national level.

On 27 July 2009 the sixth person died: a 53-year-old man, in the Hospital La Ribera in Alzira, Valencia. He had a serious prior pathology.

On 10 August the ninth person died: a 28-year-old woman admitted to the Hospital 9 de Octubre in Valencia.

On 14 August the eleventh person died, a 31-year-old pregnant woman in an irreversible coma in the Hospital General, Castellón de la Plana.

Castilla-La Mancha 
On 29 July 2009, a 34-year-old man died (the seventh in Spain) in Villarrobledo, Albacete. He had been admitted on 12 July with a serious illness.

Catalonia 
On 4 August 2009 the first death in Catalonia and eighth in the country occurred. The patient, a 35-year-old woman, died in Girona after being admitted to hospital two days before.

Galicia 

The first case of H1N1 in Galicia was recorded on 29 April 2009 in the province of Ourense, although it was not confirmed until several days later. The deceased was a woman who had recently travelled to Mexico.

Patients with similar symptoms to those of H1N1 had been recorded previously and were considered as possible cases at the time. The first was detected in Mos on 27 April 2009 in a middle-aged male patient who had arrived from Mexico several days beforehand. The first flu case in Spain was confirmed on the same day in Almansa, but was unrelated. On 1 May 2009 another new suspected case appeared in A Coruña, also in a Mexican person. Several days later these cases were confirmed to be unrelated to H1N1.

On 27 August 2009 a 33-year-old male died in Vigo due to complications from flu, although he had other serious conditions.

See also 
 2009 swine flu pandemic
 Avian influenza
 Spanish flu
 2009 flu pandemic in France
 2009 swine flu pandemic in the United States
 2009 swine flu pandemic in Canada
 2009 swine flu pandemic in Mexico

References

External links 

 Swine Influenza official data (in spanish) – Ministerio de Sanidad y Políticas Sociales. Gobierno de España
 World Health Organization (WHO) Swine Influenza page – Updates periodically and links to archived WHO releases 
 Centers for Disease Control and Prevention (CDC): Swine Influenza (Flu) 
 Medical Encyclopedia Medline Plus: Swine Flu 
 Medical Encyclopedia WebMD: Swine Flu Center

Spanish Health Services 
 Ministry of Health and Social Policy of Spain official website, Special about the swine flu 
 Department of Health of the Basque Government 
 Official website of the Basque Health Service/Osakidetza 
 Department of Health of the Generalitat of Catalonia 
 Enciclopedia Médica Medline Plus: Gripe porcina 
 Organización Mundial de la Salud (OMS): Gripe porcina 

Flu Pandemic in Spain, 2009
Health disasters in Spain
Spain
Articles containing video clips
2009 disasters in Spain